Malad West Assembly constituency is a constituency of the Maharashtra Legislative Assembly, located in the metropolis of Mumbai. It is one of the 26 Vidhan Sabha constituencies located in suburban Mumbai.

Overview
Malad West constituency is one of the 26 Vidhan Sabha constituencies located in the Mumbai Suburban district.

Malad West is part of the Mumbai North Lok Sabha constituency along with five other Vidhan Sabha segments, namely Borivali, Magathane, Dahisar, Kandivali East and Charkop in the Mumbai Suburban district.

Members of Legislative Assembly

Election results

2019 result

2014 result

2009 result

See also
 Malad
 List of constituencies of Maharashtra Vidhan Sabha

References

Assembly constituencies of Mumbai
Politics of Mumbai Suburban district
Assembly constituencies of Maharashtra